The Movement for the Defence of National Rights, also known as the Turkish National Movement encompasses the political and military activities of the Turkish revolutionaries that resulted in the creation and shaping of the modern Republic of Turkey, as a consequence of the defeat of the Ottoman Empire in World War I and the subsequent occupation of Constantinople and partitioning of the Ottoman Empire by the Allies under the terms of the Armistice of Mudros. The Turkish revolutionaries rebelled against this partitioning and against the Treaty of Sèvres, signed in 1920 by the Ottoman government, which partitioned portions of Anatolia itself. 

This establishment of an alliance of Turkish revolutionaries during the partitioning resulted in the Turkish War of Independence, the abolition of the Ottoman sultanate on 1 November 1922 and the declaration of the Republic of Turkey on 29 October 1923. The movement organized itself into the Association for the Defence of National Rights of Anatolia and Rumeli, which eventually declared that the only source of governance for the Turkish people would be the Grand National Assembly of Turkey.

The movement was created in 1919 through a series of agreements and conferences throughout Anatolia and Thrace. The process was aimed to unite independent movements around the country to build a common voice and is attributed to Mustafa Kemal Atatürk, as he was the primary spokesperson, public figure, and military leader of the movement.

Amasya Agreement, June 1919

The Amasya Agreement was important in many respects. It was the first call to the national movement against the occupying powers. It consisted of talks about national independence. 
The message read as follows:

 The unity of the motherland and national independence are in danger.
 The Istanbul government is unable to carry out its responsibilities.
 It is only through the nation's effort and determination that national independence will be won.
 It is necessary to establish a national committee, free from all external influences and control, that will review the national situation and make known to the world the peoples desires for justice.
 It has been decided to hold immediately a National Congress in Sivas, the most secure place in Anatolia.
 Three representatives from each province should be sent immediately to the Sivas Congress.
 To be prepared for every eventuality, this subject should be kept a national secret.
 There will be a congress for the Eastern Provinces on July 10. The delegation from the Erzurum Congress will depart to join to the general meeting in Sivas.
This agreement was signed by Mustafa Kemal Atatürk, Rauf Orbay, Ali Fuat Cebesoy, Refet Bele and later Kâzım Karabekir in Erzurum.

Conferences

Erzurum Congress, August 1919

On American Mandate: On 1 August 1919, the King-Crane Commission tried to contact a large groups of interested parties in Constantinople (Ottoman Control), to obtain their positions with a view toward reporting them to the Paris Peace Conference. Kazım Karabekir learned that a memorandum was adopted by an amalgamation of political groups in Constantinople and consequently, the Erzurum Congress, which has been in session since 23 July (until 7 August 1919) sent a memorandum to American President Woodrow Wilson on the same day (1 August). It was probably also meant to remind all other parties of Wilson's 14 Points and the fact that the Nationalists were aware of them. Among the objectives of the Nationalists was, it appears, to signal the resolve of the Nationalists to the interested parties, and display their intent not to tolerate indiscriminate political pressure. What began as a suggestion to the Nationalists to accept the American Mandate at the time of the Erzurum Congress, became a major campaign immediately afterwards. By the time Sivas Congress was convened, no less than three channels were working on the Nationalist leadership to persuade them at least to "consider" the American Mandate, if not outright adopt a resolution in favor of it at the Sivas Congress.

Sivas Congress, September 1919

The Sivas Congress was the first time the fourteen leaders of the movement united under a single roof. These people formed a plan between 16 and 29 October. They agreed that the parliament should meet in Constantinople, even if it were obvious that this parliament could not function under the occupation. It was a great chance to build the base and legitimacy. They decided on formalizing a "Representative Committee" that would handle the distribution and implementation, which could easily be turned into a new government if allies decided to disband the whole Ottoman Governing structure. Mustafa Kemal established two concepts into this program: independence and integrity. Mustafa Kemal was setting the stage for conditions which would legitimize this organization and illegitimate the Ottoman parliament. These conditions were also mentioned in the Wilsonian rules.

Mustafa Kemal opened the National Congress at Sivas, with delegates from the entire nation taking part. The Erzurum resolutions were transformed into a national appeal, and the name of the organization changed to the Society to Defend the Rights and Interests of the Provinces of Anatolia and Rumeli. The Erzurum resolutions were reaffirmed with minor additions, these included new clauses such as article 3 which states that the formation of an independent Greece on the Aydın, Manisa, and Balıkesir fronts was unacceptable. The Sivas Congress essentially reinforced the stance taken at the Erzurum Congress. All these were performed while the Harbord Commission arrived in Constantinople.

Amasya Protocol, October 1919

Grand National Assembly, April 1920

Plans were made to organize a new government and parliament in Ankara, and the sultan asked to accept its authority. A flood of supporters moved to Ankara just ahead of the Allied dragnets. Included among them were Halide Edip, her husband, Adnan Adıvar, İsmet İnönü, Kemal’s most important allies in the Ministry of War, and the last president of the Chamber of Deputies, Celalettin Arif. The latter's desertion of the capital was of great significance. A legally elected president of the last representative Ottoman Parliament, he claimed that it had been dissolved illegally, in violation of the Constitution, enabling Kemal to assume full governmental powers for the Ankara regime.

On March 1920, he announced that the Turkish nation was establishing its own Parliament in Ankara under the name Grand National Assembly. Some 100 members of the Ottoman Parliament were able to escape the Allied roundup and joined 190 deputies elected around the country by the national resistance group. On April 23, 1920, the new Assembly gathered for the first time, making Mustafa Kemal its first president and İsmet Inonü, now deputy from Edirne, chief of the General Staff.

Conclusion
After the establishment of the movement and the successful Turkish War of Independence, the revolutionaries abolished the Ottoman sultanate on November 1, 1922, and proclaimed the Republic of Turkey on October 29, 1923. The  movement terminated the Treaty of Sèvres and negotiated the Treaty of Lausanne, assuring recognition of the national borders, termed Misak-ı Millî (National Pact).

The national forces were united around the leadership of Mustafa Kemal Atatürk and the authority of the Grand National Assembly set up in Ankara, which pursued the Turkish War of Independence. The movement gathered around the idea of the integration of the other native populations (Greeks, Armenians, Assyrians) to make Turkish nation-state and a progressively defined political ideology that is generally termed "Kemalism", or "Atatürkçülük" ("Atatürkism"). Its basic principles stress the Republic - a form of government representing the power of the  electorate, secular administration (laïcité), nationalism, a mixed economy with state participation in some sectors (as opposed to state socialism), and national modernization.

Turkish revolutionaries were mainly influenced by ideas which flourished during the Tanzimat period. The revolutionaries should not be associated with the Young Turk movement of the same era, which was tightly bound to the Ottoman State and the ideals of Ottomanism. Turkish revolutionaries indeed were not a homogeneous group of people, as they had different ideas on social and political issues. There were years in which most of them did not communicate with each other, even though they presided over the major social and political institutions. The common idea which held them together was having a sovereign nation.

See also
Turkish War of Independence
List of high-ranking commanders of the Turkish War of Independence
Kuva-yi Milliye

References

Further reading

External links

National liberation movements
Turkish nationalist organizations
Turkish War of Independence
20th-century revolutions
Turkish revolutionary organizations